Neu! Vinyl Box is a compilation box set by the German band Neu!, formed by Klaus Dinger and Michael Rother. Released in 2010 on vinyl, digital download and promotional CD; it consists of the group's three 1970s studio albums (Neu!, Neu! 2 and Neu! '75); Neu! '86, their aborted mid-1980s album; and a 12" maxi-single of highlights of a 1972 rehearsal recording. The boxset also included a 36-page picture book, stencil, T-shirt and digital download code.

Track listing
All songs written and composed by Klaus Dinger and Michael Rother.

Neu!

Neu! 2

Neu! '75

Neu! '86

Neu! '72 - 6 May 72 - Non-Public Test

References

2010 compilation albums
Neu! albums
Albums produced by Conny Plank